Landcare Australia is the name for a community not-for-profit organisation which involves local groups of volunteers repairing the natural environment.  Originally projects focused on agricultural farmland.  The idea was that farmers, conservationists and scientists could work together to improve both farm quality and natural ecosystems.

The Landcare Australia organisation has grown and diversified since its small-scale origins in the 1980s.  The Landcare concept has grown to include groups working on town and city green areas, waterways, beaches and larger park areas.  For example, Landcare Australia now has Coastcare and "Junior Landcare" groups. These are unrelated to Caring for Country projects in which Aboriginal and Torres Strait Islander people are involved.

History
The concept of "landcare" brings people together who share a common problem and usually live in the same drainage basin or "catchment", an area that collects and directs water to a common point. By working together in a catchment, land degradation problems can be tackled successfully. Many of the first groups were set up to eradicate rabbits in Australia and to address other specific farm land degradation issues. The Landcare concept has now extended beyond this, to include rural farming, lifestyle and community development.

The movement began in Victoria, Australia in 1986 when a group of farmers near St Arnaud in central Victoria formed the first Landcare group, a voluntary group to repair the natural environment. Since then, the Landcare concept has spread across Australia and to about 15 other countries.  There are approximately 4000 Landcare groups in Australia.

Important people in the creation of Landcare were Rick Farley of the National Farmers Association, environment  lobbyist Barbara Hardy AO and Phillip Toyne, both from the Australian Conservation Foundation. Former premier of Victoria Joan Kirner and Heather Mitchell were also early proponents of the idea.

Landcare as an organisation received a great boost when the Australian Federal Government of Prime Minister Bob Hawke declared a decade of landcare and established a continuing funding mechanism to enable the volunteers to continue and expand their work.

Activities

The range of activities now included within Landcare programs has expanded to include research that measures effectiveness of previous activities, fencing out stock so that vegetation can regrow, creating windbreaks for livestock protection, channelling and speeding waterways, and combating soil salinity. Many of the tasks are carried out to correct mistakes in farming practices conducted decades ago and sometimes a project simply involve the sharing of ideas related to caring for the land. Other activities include weed removal, using biological controls and farm beautification.

Affiliates
Landcare groups in Australia are supported by Landcare Australia as a national body as well as by national and state-based agencies or organisations, including:
Landcare NSW;
Landcare NT;
The Landcare Association of South Australia, aka Landcare SA;
Queensland Water & Land Carers;
Landcare Victoria Inc. (LVI), formed in 2017 when the Farm Tree and Landcare Association (FTLA) merged with the Victorian Landcare Council (VLC) in 2017;
Landcare Tasmania; and
The  Western Australia Landcare Network (WALN), formed in May 2013.

Landcare Australia maintains the online National Landcare Directory (NLD), which includes a wide variety of community-based groups across Australia, including landcare networks and groups, farmers, landholders, traditional custodians, junior groups and coastcare groups.

Governance
The CEO of Landcare Australia  is Shane Norrish. The organisation is governed by a board headed by chair (2021) Doug Humann , former leader of Bush Heritage Australia.

National Landcare Awards
Landcare Australia runs the biennial National Landcare Awards. The 2020 awards ceremony was postponed to August 2021 owing to the COVID-19 pandemic in Australia, with an awards ceremony hosted by ABC TV presenter Costa Georgiadis was held online, along with the Landcare Australia conference. Awards were given over nine categories, including youth, Indigenous, soil care and farming.

Caring for Country
There are a number of projects known as "Caring for Country" in operation. These focus on local Indigenous people working to repair Indigenous lands and to preserve the environment using their cultural knowledge and connection to country, and are often carried out in conjunction with non-Indigenous people and organisations who are willing and able to assist. The organisation and funding of Caring for Country projects is often different to local Landcare groups. Federal government landcare (under the National Landcare Program and Caring for Our Country budgets) has funded projects and Indigenous ranger positions.

See also

Conservation in Australia
Environmental issues in Australia
Indigenous rangers
Phillip Toyne

References

External links
 

Environmental organisations based in Australia
Nature conservation in Australia
1986 establishments in Australia
Land management in Australia
Bob Hawke